Ludmila Valentinovna Berlinskaya is a Russian pianist and actress born in 1960 in Moscow. She is the daughter of cellist Valentin Berlinsky, founder of the Borodin Quartet.

Life 
Berlinskaya is the daughter of a lawyer mother and musician father: cellist Valentin Berlinsky, founder of the Borodin Quartet.

Her childhood was spent in the presence of the many artists and figures in the Russian intelligentsia who surrounded her parents such as composers Mieczysław Weinberg, Dmitri Shostakovitch, Alfred Schnittke, Sofia Gubaidulina; musicians Mstislav Rostropovitch, David Oistrakh, Daniil Shafran, Yakov Zak, Alexander Goldenweiser, Yakov Flier; conductors Yuri Temirkanov, Yevgeny Svetlanov, Gennady Rozhdestvensky, Dmitri Kitayenko; artists Anatoly Zverev, Nikolai Silis, Vadim Sidur, Vladimir Lemporte, Rustam Khamdamov, Dmitry Krasnopevtsev, author Aleksandr Solzhenitsyn and academic Andrei Sakharov.

Ludmila Berlinskaya began playing piano at the age of five and a year later enrolled at the Gnessin Musical College in Anna Kantor's class, best known for teaching Evgeny Kissin and Nikolai Demidenko. At the age of 17 she enrolled at the Moscow Conservatory in Mikhail Voskressensky's class.

She began performing on stage with the Borodin Quartet at the age of 14; she made her orchestra debut at 15 and began touring the USSR giving solo or chamber music performances everywhere from the Baltics and Kamchatka to the Ukraine and Siberia with other young talented musicians such as Alexander Rudin and Alexander Kniazev. 17‑year-old Ludmila began performing with famous musicians such as Yuri Bashmet and Viktor Tretiakov. By the age of 19 she had already performed on the greatest stages in the Soviet Union in Moscow, Saint Petersburg, Nizhny-Novgorod and other cultural capitals.

A key stage in her life came during her musical career: 13‑year-old Ludmila Berlinskaya played one of the three lead roles in the film A Great Space Voyage by Valentin Selyanov which was a phenomenal success and became the symbol of a generation. She performed the two main songs for the film (Ты мне веришь или нет; млечный путь) both composed by Alexey Rybnikov; these pop songs were and are still played on Russian radio stations on a regular basis. Ludmila Berlinskaya was then offered several roles but turned them all down in favour of music.

15‑year-old Ludmila Berlinskaya entered the privileged circle that was the entourage of Sviatoslav Richter. Chosen and protected by him, she saw him as a spiritual father and soaked up the creative atmosphere that surrounded the great artist. From the end of the 70s to the start of the 80s, she was even the pianist's page turner, a rather unusual role.
Besides Sviatoslav Richter's personal influence which greatly affected her future decisions, Ludmila Berlinskaya made the most of the relationship to befriend numerous artists: Yuri Borissov, Yevgeny Mravinsky, Galina Ulanova, Boris Pokrovsky, Ivan Kozlovsky, Dietrich Fischer-Dieskau, Peter Schreier, Christoph Eschenbach, Vladimir Vasiliev, Stanislav Neuhaus, Natalia Gutman, Oleg Kagan, Innokenty Smoktunovsky and others.

She made numerous appearances at Richter's festival at the Pushkin Museum of Fine Arts: the December Nights festival whose annual schedule takes the theme of an exhibition hosted by the museum in the room in which the concerts take place.

Among her many performances at the festival, she played piano four hands with Sviatoslav Richter at the event in 1985 and she replaced him at the last minute for the piano section of the Britten opera The Turn of the Screw.

Well known for his reluctance regarding competitions, Richter encouraged Ludmila Berlinskaya not to go down this route. In spite of some appearances, in which she won the top prize (top prizes in chamber music competitions in Paris and Florence; Leonardo prize), she followed his advice and stopped competing in the top international competitions.

She met the young conductor Vladimir Ziva whilst with Richter. They got married and had a son, Dmitri Berlinsky, not to be confused with the violinist of the same name. Ludmila Berlinskaya's son is now a professional cello player following studies with Pavel Gomziakov, Natalia Shakhovskaya and Roland Pidoux.

In 1989, Ludmila Berlinskaya moved to Paris with her second husband, Anton Matalaev, first violinist in the Anton Quartet, who had just won the Grand Prix at the Concours d'Évian. Ludmila Berlinskaya began performing with Mstislav Rostropovich in Europe on a regular basis whilst in Paris. Following their first concert at the Paris Town Hall, the then mayor's wife, Mrs Chirac, offered Ludmila Berlinskaya the chance to create a festival: the Salon Musical Russe.

Anton Matalaev and Ludmila Berlinskaya have a daughter, Macha Matalaev, born in 1991. Anton Matalev died in 2002.

The 90s were a busy decade for partnerships and concert performances. Ludmila Berlinskaya performed recitals and chamber music in the greatest international venues such as Wigmore Hall and Barbican Hall in London, Concertgebouw in Amsterdam, Théâtre des Champs-Élysées and Salle Gaveau in Paris, the Moscow Conservatory, the Fenice in Venice, the Royal Academies of Brussels and Madrid plus a large number of festivals.

A great specialist in chamber music, her talent has been called upon by new partners such as Gautier Capuçon, Henri Demarquette, David Geringas, Alain Meunier, Pavel Gomziakov, Philippe Muller, Dominique de Williencourt, Gérard Poulet, Sarah Nemtanu, Gérard Caussé, Jean-Marc Luisada, François-René Duchâble, Paul Meyer, the Modigliani Quartet, the Orlando Quartet, the Danel Quartet, the Fine Arts Quartet, the Saint Petersburg Quartet, the Ardeo Quartet, the Moraguès Quintet and other famous ensembles.

Ludmila Berlinskaya is known as a great specialist in Shostakovitch music having played all his chamber music for piano with well-known partners and even rarer or more unusual pieces.

In 2001 she founded her second Festival, "Printemps Musical à Paris", which was taking place in different venues in Paris. It hosted Alexandre Scriabine's Parisian creation Prométhée and for the first time in Paris after George Balanchine, Aubade by Poulenc with a dancer.

Alongside her concert performances, Ludmila Berlinskaya has been teaching at the École Normale de Musique de Paris "Alfred Cortot" since 2006.

In June 2009, she founded the Association Berlinsky following the death of Valentin Berlinsky on December 15, 2008.

She performed a piano duet with her husband and French pianist Arthur Ancelle in 2011. Released in spring 2012 through Saphir Productions, their first album was devoted to pieces by Pyotr Ilyich Tchaikovsky and won several awards. The second album, devoted to Sergei Prokofiev's ballets, was released in 2014 through the Melodia record label: it's the first recording to be entirely produced and released by Melodia since the fall of the USSR.

Ludmila Berlinskaya is the artistic co-director of a new music festival in the Loir-et-Cher, "La Clé des Portes", instigated by the Club d'Entreprises des Portes de Chambord.

In 2016, Ludmila Berlinskaya had performed another piano duet with Arthur Ancelle playing Danse macabre of Camille Saint-Saëns in Salle Cortot of Paris.

Discography
Schumann: December Nights 1985 - Sviatoslav Richter, Borodin Quartet, Ludmila Berlinskaya - Melodiya (Мелодия)

Rachmaninoff: Sonata for cello, Vocalise, Trio Elegiaque - Valentin Berlinsky, Anton Matalaev, Ludmila Berlinskaya

Glinka: Piano pieces, Grand Sextet - Ludmila Berlinskaya, Borodin Quartet, Grigori Kovalevski - 2003 - Europe Arts

Schnittke: Quartet n°3, Quintet, Piano Quartet - Borodin Quartet, Ludmila Berlinskaya - Virgin Classics

Mendelssohn, Janáček, Strauss: Sonatas for violin and piano - Gérard Poulet, Ludmila Berlinskaya - 2009 - Saphir Productions

Tchaikovsky: Francesca da Rimini, Casse-Noisette - Ludmila Berlinskaya, Arthur Ancelle - 2011 - Saphir Productions

Prokofiev: Romeo & Juliet, Cinderella - Ludmila Berlinskaya, Arthur Ancelle – 2014 - Melodiya

Scriabin: Preludes, Sonatas 4 & 9, Towards the Flame, Julian Scriabin, Boris Pasternak - Ludmila Berlinskaya - 2015 - Melodiya

References

External links
Loir-et-Cher : la Clé des Portes déclare son amour en juillet 
Le festival La Clé des Portes entre Mer et Talcy 
Pianobleu.com

1960 births
Living people
Russian women pianists
Actresses from Moscow
Gnessin State Musical College alumni
Academic staff of the École Normale de Musique de Paris
21st-century classical pianists
Women music educators
21st-century Russian women musicians
Musicians from Moscow
21st-century Russian musicians
20th-century Russian actresses
20th-century classical pianists
20th-century Russian women musicians
20th-century Russian musicians
Russian film actresses
Women classical pianists
20th-century women pianists
21st-century women pianists